The Ecumenical Patriarchate and Mount Athos, and also the Greek Orthodox Churches in the diaspora under the Patriarchate use a black double-headed eagle in a yellow field as their flag or emblem.

The eagle is depicted as clutching a sword and an orb with a crown above and between its two heads. An earlier variant of the flag, used in the 1980s, combined the double-headed eagle design with the blue-and-white stripes of the flag of Greece.

The design is sometimes dubbed the "Byzantine imperial flag", and is considered—inaccurately—to have been the actual historical banner of the Byzantine Empire. The double-headed eagle was historically used as an emblem in the late Byzantine period (14th–15th centuries), but not on flags; rather it was embroidered on imperial clothing and accoutrements by both the Palaiologos emperors of the Byzantine Empire and the Grand Komnenos rulers of the Empire of Trebizond, descendants of the Byzantine imperial family of the same name. The actual flag of the Palaiologan-era Byzantine Empire was based on the tetragrammatic cross in gold on a red background. This design also forms the basis for another flag used by the Orthodox Church of Greece, with the added inscription of TOYTῼ NIKA (i.e. in hoc signo vinces).

References

See also

 Flag of Greece

Greek Orthodoxy
Religious flags
Flags displaying animals